Shubhang Hegde (born 30 March 2001) is an Indian cricketer. He made his first-class debut for Karnataka in the 2018–19 Ranji Trophy on 7 January 2019. In December 2019, he was named in India's squad for the 2020 Under-19 Cricket World Cup.

References

External links
 

2001 births
Living people
Indian cricketers
Karnataka cricketers
Place of birth missing (living people)